The Blue Mountain vireo (Vireo osburni) is a species of bird in the family Vireonidae. It is endemic to Jamaica. Its natural habitats are subtropical or tropical moist lowland forests, subtropical or tropical moist montane forests, plantations, and heavily degraded former forest. It is threatened by habitat loss.

References

Blue Mountain vireo
Endemic birds of Jamaica
Blue Mountain vireo
Blue Mountain vireo
Taxonomy articles created by Polbot